Gonçalves (Portuguese for "son of Gonçalo") is a Portuguese surname. Notable people with the surname include:

 Adílio de Oliveira Gonçalves (born 1956), Brazilian footballer
 Ailton Goncalves da Silva (born 1973), Brazilian footballer
 André Goncalves (explorer), 15th/16th-century Portuguese explorer of Brasil
 André Goncalves (painter) (1685-1754), Portuguese Baroque painter
 André Caetano Goncalves (born 1992), Swiss-Portuguese footballer
 Antão Goncalves, 15th-century Portuguese explorer
 Diogo Gonçalves (born 1997), Portuguese footballer
 Gilberto Ribeiro Goncalves (born 1980), Brazilian footballer
 Isilda Goncalves (born 1969), Portuguese race walker
 João Gonçalves Zarco (1390-1471), Portuguese explorer, discovered the archipelago of Madeira
 Joaquim Gonçalves (1936–2013), Portuguese Roman Catholic bishop
 José Gonçalves (born 1985), Portuguese footballer
 Khalid Gonçalves (born 1971), American actor
 Laura Gonçalves (born 1989), Miss Portugal 2011, Top 10 at Miss Universe 2011
 Marcelo Gonçalves Costa Lopes (born 1966), Brazilian former football player
 Mateus Alberto Contreiras Gonçalves (born 1983), Angolan footballer
Matheus Gonçalves,  Brazilian footballer
 Matheus Trindade - a Brazilian footballer, whose full name is Matheus Trindade Gonçalves.
 Matheus Sávio - a Brazlian footballer, whose full name is Matheus Gonçalves Savio.
 Nelson Gonçalves (1919-1998), Brazilian singer and songwriter
 Nuno Gonçalves (fl. 1450-1471), Portuguese artist
 Paulo Sérgio Moreira Gonçalves (born 1984), Portuguese footballer
 Vanessa Gonçalves (born 1986), Miss Venezuela 2010, Top 16 at Miss Universe 2011
 Vasco Gonçalves (1921-2005), Portuguese Prime Minister
 Dercy Gonçalves (1907-2008), Brazilian actress and comedian

See also
 Gonsalves, English language variation of Gonçalves
 Gonzalez (disambiguation), Spanish equivalent of Gonçalves
 Gonsales, Portuguese variation of Gonzalez
 Gonzales (disambiguation), Spanish variation of Gonzalez

Portuguese-language surnames
Patronymic surnames
Surnames from given names